The 1969–70 FA Cup was the 89th season of the world's oldest football cup competition, the Football Association Challenge Cup, commonly known as the FA Cup. First Division Chelsea won the competition for the first time, first drawing with Leeds United 2–2 in the final at Wembley, before winning 2–1 in the replay at Old Trafford.

Matches were scheduled to be played at the stadium of the team named first on the date specified for each round, which was always a Saturday. Some matches, however, might be rescheduled for  other days if there were clashes with games for other competitions or the weather was inclement. If scores were level after 90 minutes had been played, a replay would take place at the stadium of the second-named team later the same week. If the replayed match was drawn further replays would be held until a winner was determined. If scores were level after 90 minutes had been played in a replay, a 30-minute period of extra time would be played.

Calendar

Results

First Round Proper

At this stage clubs from the Football League Third and Fourth Divisions joined 30 non-league clubs having come through the qualifying rounds. To complete this round, North Shields and Sutton United given byes. Matches were scheduled to be played on Saturday, 15 November 1969. Thirteen matches were drawn, of which two went to second replays and one of these to a third.

Second Round Proper 
The matches were scheduled for Saturday, 6 December 1969. Seven matches were drawn, with replays taking place later the same week. Two games needed a second replay, and one of these a third.

Third Round Proper
The 44 First and Second Division clubs entered the competition at this stage. The matches were scheduled Saturday, 3 January 1970, but three were played at later dates. Nine matches were drawn and went to replays, with one of these requiring a second replay.

Fourth Round Proper
The matches were scheduled for Saturday, 24 January 1970. Five matches were drawn, with the replays taking place three or four days later.

Fifth Round Proper
The matches were scheduled for Saturday, 7 February 1970, with one replay played four days later.

Sixth Round Proper

The four quarter-final ties were played on the 21 February 1970. There was one replay on the following Wednesday.

Replay

Semi-finals

The semi-final matches were played on Saturday, 14 March 1970 with the Manchester United–Leeds United tie needing two replays to settle the contest over the following 12 days, with the tie needing 219 minutes to produce a goal. Manchester United were made to pay for missed chances in the first two games, including George Best falling over the ball in the first replay, as Leeds came through in the second replay with a Billy Bremner goal. Chelsea came through the other semi final to meet Leeds at Wembley.

Replay

Second Replay

Third place play-off
Between 1970 and 1974, a third place playoff between the two losing semi-finalists was held.

Final

The 1970 FA Cup Final was contested by Leeds United and Chelsea at Wembley on the 11 April 1970.  The match finished as a 2–2 draw after extra time and so went to a replay. The second final match took place at Old Trafford, Manchester on the 29 April 1970. This match finished 1–1 after 90 minutes, again requiring extra time to be played before Chelsea finished as the victors.

Replay

References
General
The FA Cup Archive at TheFA.com
English FA Cup 1969/70 at Soccerbase
F.A. Cup results 1969/70 at Footballsite
Specific

 
FA Cup seasons
Fa
Eng